Traverse Township is a township in Nicollet County, Minnesota, United States. The population was 367 at the 2000 census. Traverse Township was organized in 1858, and named after Traverse.

Geography
According to the United States Census Bureau, the township has a total area of 23.6 square miles (61.2 km), of which 23.0 square miles (59.6 km)  is land and 0.6 square mile (1.6 km)  (2.54%) is water.

Demographics
As of the census of 2000, there were 367 people, 127 households, and 102 families residing in the township.  The population density was 15.9 people per square mile (6.2/km).  There were 131 housing units at an average density of 5.7/sq mi (2.2/km).  The racial makeup of the township was 99.18% White, 0.54% Native American, and 0.27% from two or more races.

There were 127 households, out of which 38.6% had children under the age of 18 living with them, 74.8% were married couples living together, 3.1% had a female householder with no husband present, and 18.9% were non-families. 11.0% of all households were made up of individuals, and 3.1% had someone living alone who was 65 years of age or older.  The average household size was 2.89 and the average family size was 3.17.

In the township the population was spread out, with 28.9% under the age of 18, 9.0% from 18 to 24, 31.1% from 25 to 44, 21.0% from 45 to 64, and 10.1% who were 65 years of age or older.  The median age was 37 years. For every 100 females, there were 128.0 males.  For every 100 females age 18 and over, there were 121.2 males.

The median income for a household in the township was $55,250, and the median income for a family was $61,250. Males had a median income of $35,682 versus $28,125 for females. The per capita income for the township was $21,861.  None of the families and 2.7% of the population were living below the poverty line, including no under eighteens and none of those over 64.

References

Townships in Nicollet County, Minnesota
Mankato – North Mankato metropolitan area
Townships in Minnesota